Cobble Hill may refer to:

In U.S. 
 Cobble Hill, an alternate name for Tyringham Cobble, a hill in Massachusetts
 Cobble Hill, Brooklyn, a neighborhood in Brooklyn, New York
 Cobble Hill Tunnel, an abandoned railroad tunnel in Brooklyn, New York
 Success Academy Cobble Hill, part of Success Academy Charter Schools

In Canada 
 Cobble Hill, British Columbia, a small community on Vancouver Island, British Columbia (BC)
 Cobble Hill (Canada), a hill in British Columbia, namesake of the community
 Cobble Hill, Ontario a community in the municipality of Thames Centre, Ontario